Sticky Fingers is a California and New York-based The Rolling Stones tribute/original recording band.  It was formed by singer Glen Carroll in 1989 after his military service.

Band members 

Various members have played with Sticky Fingers during recording sessions and gigs.

Band consists of musicians that admire and several that have performed with The Rolling Stones. Carroll started as the band's drummer, but became the lead singer after "going through several vocalists a month".

Album
Sticky Fingers released their album "Like a Rolling Stone" in November 2012.

It includes original works in the styling of 1960's-1970's classic rock inspired by the sounds of the Rolling Stones. The Skope Magazine, which has reviewed the release, acknowledges this feature as well as stylistic variety of some of songs resulting from influences of "George Thorogood and the Destroyers" and “Bad Reputation” by Joan Jett.

Track listing 

All songs written by Glen Carroll unless otherwise noted.

Personnel 
Credits adapted from waddywachtelinfo.com.

 Glen Carroll – vocals, percussion, background Vocals (tracks 1 - 11)
 Waddy Wachtel – acoustic guitar, electric guitar, dobro, slide guitar, guitar solos (tracks 1 - 11)
 Kenny Aronoff – drums, percussion (tracks 1 - 11)
 Kenny Aaronson – bass, pedal steel (tracks 1 - 11)
 Bobby Keys – saxophone (tracks 1, 5, 6, 7, 8, 9, 10)
 Bernard Fowler – background vocals (tracks 1, 3, 4, 5, 11)

 Andy Johns – producer
 Fred Knoblock – Engineer
 Rene Van Verseveld – engineer
 Nate Staley – engineer
 Niko Bolas – mixing
 Ron McMaster – mastering
 John Pasche – album art
 Jim Steinfeldt – insert photos
"Like a Rolling Stone" is the "Top 10 Album" in 2013 according to 'The Aquarian Weekly' writers.

'Like a Rolling Stone' Book 

In 2008, author Steven Kurutz released his book “Like a Rolling Stone: The Strange Life of a Tribute Band.”  It features Glen Carroll on the cover and observes the world of Sticky Fingers while they repeated the path of The Rolling Stones 2005-2006 tour, playing at different places.

Steven Kurutz defines Sticky Fingers as a tribute band because these musicians not only strives to sound but also look like The Rolling Stones. As Kurutz says, such tribute bands "dedicate themselves to one particular group and try to emulate them".

Television 
In January, 2013 the Sticky Fingers were invited as guest judges on WCBS-FM's "Jukebox Jury: Should There Be A Rock & Roll Retirement Age?" discussing iconic rock bands like The Rolling Stones and The Beach Boys, which are still not only making influence on the modern rock scene but recording new music.

References

External links

The Rolling Stones
Tribute bands